{{DISPLAYTITLE:C4H8OS}}
The molecular formula C4H8OS (molar mass: 104.17 g/mol, exact mass: 104.0296 u) may refer to:

 1,4-Oxathiane
 Methional

Molecular formulas